This is a Bibliography of World War II battles and campaigns in Europe, North Africa and the Middle East. It aims to include the major theaters, campaigns and battles of the European theater of World War II. It is part of Wikipedia's larger effort to document the Bibliography of World War II. Its counterpart for the Asia-Pacific theater is the Bibliography of World War II battles and campaigns in East Asia, South East Asia and the Pacific.

Bibliography

General history of the European theater

Invasion of Poland (1939)

Phony War (1939–1940)

Altmark incident (1940)

Baltic Sea campaigns (1939–1945)

Battle of the Atlantic and Arctic Oceans (1939–1945)

Winter War (1939–1940)

Operation Weserübung (1940)

Western Campaign (1940)

East African campaign (1940–1941)

Battle of the Mediterranean (1940–1945)

Battle of Cape Matapan (March 1941)

North African campaign (1940–1943)

Siege of Malta (1940–1942)

Battle of Britain (1940)

Balkans campaign (1940–1941)

Anglo-Iraqi War (1941)

Syria-Lebanon campaign (1941)

Eastern Front (1941–1945)

General

Operation Barbarossa (1941)

Crimean campaign (1941–42)

Operation Typhoon and Battle of Moscow (1941)

Siege of Leningrad (1941–44)

Winter campaigns (1941/42)

Second Battle of Kharkov (1942)

Case Blue (1942)

Battle of Stalingrad (1942/43)

Winter campaigns (1942/43)

Operation Citadel and Battle of Kursk (1943)

Operation Bagration (1944)

Baltic Offensive (1944)

Siege of Budapest (1944–45)

Soviet conquest of Germany (1945)

Battle of Berlin (1945)

Anglo-Soviet invasion of Iran (1941)

Italian campaign (1943–1945)

Battle of Monte Cassino (January–May 1944)

Battle of Anzio (January–June 1944)

Dodecanese campaign (1943)

Western Front (1944–1945)

General

Normandy landings, Battle of Normandy (1944)

Falaise Pocket (1944)

Operation Market Garden (1944)

Battle of Arnhem (1944)

Battle of the Bulge / Ardennes Offensive (1944–45)

Malmedy Massacre (1944)

Siege of Bastogne (1944)

Western Allied conquest of Germany (1945)

Warsaw Uprising (1944)

See also 

 Bibliography of Adolf Hitler
 Bibliography of The Holocaust
 Bibliography of the Holocaust in Greece
 Bibliography of World War II
 Bibliography of World War II battles and campaigns in East Asia, South East Asia and the Pacific
European Theater